The 2005–06 Wisconsin Badgers women's ice hockey team was the Badgers' 6th season. Led by head coach Mark Johnson, the Badgers won their first NCAA championship.

Regular season

Schedule

Awards and honors
Sara Bauer, Patty Kazmaier Award winner
Sara Bauer, CoSIDA Academic All-District V
Sara Bauer, ESPN The Magazine At-Large Academic All-American of the Year
Sara Bauer, WCHA Player of the Year
Mark Johnson, AHCA Division I Coach of the Year
Mark Johnson, WCHA Coach of the Year
Bobbi Jo Slusar, AHCA All-Americans First Team
Bobbi Jo Slusar, Patty Kazmaier Award Top-10 Finalist
Bobbi Jo Slusar, WCHA Defensive Player of the Year

All-WCHA honors
Sara Bauer, First Team
Sharon Cole, Second Team
Meaghan Mikkelson, Second Team
Bobbi Jo Slusar, First Team

Team honors
Nicki Burish, W Club Community Service Award
Sara Bauer, Offensive Player of the Year
Sara Bauer, UW Athletic Board Scholars (letterwinners who have the highest cumulative grade point average in their respective sport)
Sharon Cole, Badger Award
Phoebe Monteleone Jeff Sauer Award
Bobbi Jo Slusar, Defensive Player of the Year
Jessie Vetter, Rookie of the Year

References

Wisconsin
Wisconsin Badgers women's ice hockey seasons
NCAA women's ice hockey Frozen Four seasons
NCAA women's ice hockey championship seasons
Wiscon
Wiscon